Karl Bushby (born 30 March 1969) is a British ex-paratrooper, walking adventurer and author, currently attempting to be the first person to completely walk an unbroken path around the world. Bushby's trek is known as the Goliath Expedition.

Early life
Bushby was born 30 March 1969 in Hull, England. He attended a local comprehensive school and joined the British Army at the age of 16. Bushby served with the 3rd Battalion The Parachute Regiment for 11 years.

Goliath Expedition

The Goliath Expedition is Bushby's attempt to walk around the world "with unbroken footsteps", from Punta Arenas, Chile, to his home in Hull, England. He began his journey on 1 November 1998 and originally expected to finish the over- trek in eight years, though numerous delays meant it has not yet been completed.

They were detained by Russian border troop officers while they were crossing the Russian border near the Chukotkan village of Uelen, for not entering Russia at a correct port-of-entry. They were threatened with being banned from Russia, which would stop the journey. It was announced on 5 May 2006 that the Russian appeal court had upheld Bushby's application and his walk would continue. This was reported to be the result of consultation between John Prescott, the then British Deputy Prime Minister (and MP in Bushby's home town of Hull), and Roman Abramovich, the then Governor of Chukotka.

On 16 March 2007, it was announced that Bushby had obtained the required permission from the Russian authorities, and began to prepare for the second half of his Goliath Expedition. Bushby would walk the first leg of this stage to Yakutsk, along with Kieffer. He had a difficult struggle with the Russian authorities to get a visa and a visit permit (the entire area is a military area, and a special visit permit is needed).

In 2008 he only walked for three weeks, reaching Bilibino. He started very late, since the visa approval was delayed, and when the snow disappeared in May he could not continue because the area is filled with swamps and rivers, impossible to penetrate on foot when not frozen. He is only allowed to be in Russia for 90 days out of every 180 days per visa, and he must leave the country before each visa expires.

From late 2008 to 2010, he spent his time in Mexico for cost reasons and was unable to travel to Russia. This was both because of trouble getting a visa and permits, and because of financial trouble; Bushby lost several of his sponsors as a result of the Financial crisis of 2007–2008.  After Bushby secured new sponsors in 2010, the Russian government issued him another visa, and he resumed walking across Russia in the spring of 2011.

In addition to the 90-day time restraint imposed by Russian visas, Bushby has been hampered by the tundra conditions. Because his route takes him through an area that can only be traveled on foot via frozen rivers and ice roads, he can only walk during the late winter and early spring. Beginning his 2012 leg, he  only needed to travel an additional  before reaching improved roads, meaning  his travel will only be limited by the Russian visa rules. On 12 April 2012, Bushby reported on his site that the Russian authorities had denied him a visa for 2012. He will continue to try to obtain a visa at some point in the future.

In March 2013, Russia banned Bushby from re-entering Russia for five years.

At the end of the adventure, Bushby's visa ban was overturned and he was granted a letter of invitation from the Russian government. He was granted a visa in 2014, at the embassy, marking the end of his year long journey.

Bushby crossed the Russia-Mongolia border in 2017, and on 8 August 2017 he was in Ulaanbaatar, Mongolia.

Bushby crossed into Uzbekistan early in June 2019, reaching the border between Turkmenistan and Iran a few months later where the voyage is currently on pause due to visa issues, and the ongoing COVID-19 pandemic.

Giant Steps
Bushby wrote a book about his walk entitled Giant Steps, first published in 2005. The latest edition (2007) includes events up to 31 March 2006, and his Bering Strait crossing. The book and the Bering Strait crossing also inspired a board game called 'Ice flow'.

See also
 List of pedestrian circumnavigators

References
Notes

Bibliography
Bushby, Karl. Giant Steps. Sphere.  (2nd ed.; 2007)

External links
Goliath Expedition home page
Goliath Expedition blog, 2009-2010
Latest update on Karl Bushby 2012 Interview with Karl Bushby 2011
Alone Around the World A long distance radio interview with Karl Bushby at Podstantsiya.ru
WideWorld Article Odyssey XXI, one man’s 15 year trek across the globe
Men's Journal Article

1969 births
Living people
British Parachute Regiment soldiers
Pedestrian circumnavigators of the globe
Walkers of the United Kingdom
Military personnel from Kingston upon Hull